Metropolitan Vancouver Hotel  is a hotel in Vancouver, British Columbia, Canada. The hotel has 197 rooms and 7,600 square feet of conference and banquet rooms, and its restaurant, Diva, is critically acclaimed, and is headed by chef Dino Renaerts. The hotel, between the financial district and the shopping area of downtown Vancouver, is popular with businesspersons. The decor is French-inspired, with dark wood beams and high ceilings.

References

External links
Official site

Hotels in Vancouver